The South African Railways Class 7D 4-8-0 of 1915 was a steam locomotive.

Between 1899 and 1903, the Rhodesia Railways placed 52 Cape 7th Class 4-8-0 Mastodon steam locomotives in service. During the Second Boer War, one more was obtained from the Imperial Military Railways in March 1901, as replacement for a locomotive which was damaged beyond local repair capabilities as a result of hostilities during delivery.

In May 1915, five of these locomotives were sold to the South African Railways, where they were renumbered and reclassified, four of them to Class 7D and the remaining one erroneously to Class 7B. At the same time, the ex Imperial Military Railways locomotive was also sold back to South Africa and was, also erroneously, designated Class 7D.

Rhodesian 7th Class
The original Cape 7th Class locomotive had been designed in 1892 by H.M. Beatty, at the time the Cape Government Railways Western System Locomotive Superintendent.

Between 1899 and 1903, 52 such Cape 7th Class 4-8-0 steam locomotives were built for the Beira and Mashonaland and Rhodesia Railways (BMR), later the Rhodesia Railways (RR). These locomotives were acquired by Southern Rhodesia at the time when railways were still expanding from South Africa via the Bechuanaland Protectorate into Southern Rhodesia in the southwest, and from Beira in Mozambique to Umtali in the east, and while the Second Boer War was in progress. At the time, the system was composed of several smaller railways, still largely under construction, which were eventually all linked up in 1902. These were:

 The fledgling Bechuanaland Railways (BR), which was still being operated by the Cape Government Railways (CGR), from Vryburg via Mafeking in the Cape Colony to Bulawayo in Southern Rhodesia.
 The Mashonaland Railways (MR), which operated in Southern Rhodesia from Bulawayo to Umtali in the east.
 The Rhodesia Railways Northern Extensions (RRM), which operated north and east of Bulawayo, towards Northern Rhodesia.
 The Beira and Mashonaland and Rhodesia Railways (BMR), which operated between Umtali in Southern Rhodesia and Beira in Mozambique.

Manufacturers
The 52 locomotives were ordered in five batches from three British manufacturers.

 Twelve were delivered by Neilson, Reid and Company between August and October 1899. They were virtually identical to the SAR Class 7A. Two of them were numbered BR7 and BR8 for the BMR, for service at the Beira end, while the rest were numbered in the range from RR1 to RR10.

 In 1901, eleven of them were renumbered in the range from MR8 to MR18, MR20 and MR21, not in order, for the BMR. The exception was no. RR8, which was delivered damaged beyond local repair abilities, apparently as a result of hostilities, while in transit through the area under control of the British Military near Mafeking. A Neilson, Reid-built 7th Class locomotive of the Imperial Military Railways (IMR), no. IMR 110, was subsequently transferred to the BMR at Umtali in March 1901 as replacement for the damaged no. RR8. It was renumbered to MR19, the number which would have been allocated to no. RR8. The renumberings are tabled below.

 A second batch of twelve were delivered by Neilson, Reid in August 1900 and numbered in the range from RR11 to RR22. They were placed in service on the line from Vryburg to Bulawayo and shedded at Mafeking. In 1901, four of them, no. RR11, RR12, RR17 and RR20, were relocated to the BMR and renumbered in the range from MR20 to MR23, in order. Many of the Neilson, Reid-built locomotives from both batches were renumbered a second time in 1906, as shown in the table.
 A third batch of eight locomotives was delivered from Kitson and Company between 1901 and 1903, numbered in the range from RR23 to RR30. These were built with Belpaire fireboxes instead of the usual round-topped fireboxes with which all earlier 7th Class locomotives of the CGR, the IMR and the RR were delivered. They were also placed in service at Mafeking.
 The fourth batch of ten locomotives, again with Belpaire fireboxes, was delivered from North British Locomotive Company (NBL) in October and November 1903. They were numbered in the range from RR31 to RR40. Of these, numbers RR31 to RR38 were allocated to the Mashonaland Railways-Kalomo-Broken Hill (MR-KB) section. They retained their RR numbers, but had brass plates with the letters "KB" affixed above their number plates on their cab sides, to indicate their ownership. The other two were also placed in service at Mafeking.
 The fifth and final batch of ten Rhodesian 7th Class locomotives was also built by NBL and delivered in November and December 1903, numbered in the range from RR41 to RR50. They were also placed in service at Mafeking.

South African Railways
In May 1915, six of the Neilson, Reid-built 7th Class locomotives were purchased by the South African Railways (SAR) to augment its locomotive stock, which was being taxed severely due to war conditions at the time. These six locomotives included the war-damaged no. RR8 which had still not been repaired and consequently never ran a mile in revenue service in Rhodesia, as well as the ex IMR locomotive which had been transferred to Rhodesia as compensation for the damaged no. RR8.

These locomotives were initially referred to as Class RR, until they were later designated SAR Class 7D. Five of them were renumbered in the range from 1351 to 1355 on the SAR roster. The sixth, SAR no. 949, was erroneously designated Class 7B.

Classification errors
During this SAR classification and renumbering process, two of these locomotives were incorrectly classified, possibly as a result of their records getting exchanged in an apparent administrative error.

 Ex IMR no. 110, which had replaced the damaged no. RR8, would have become Central South African Railways (CSAR) no. 380 in 1902 and, with the rest of the ex IMR locomotives, would have been designated SAR Class 7B in 1912, but this never happened since the engine had already been transferred to the BMR at Umtali in March 1901. When it was taken onto the SAR roster from Rhodesia in 1915, it was incorrectly designated as Class 7D instead of Class 7B and renumbered SAR no. 1355.
 Ex no. RR1, later no. MR8 and then no. RRM63, was incorrectly designated as Class 7B instead of ex IMR no. 110 and was renumbered SAR no. 949.

Class 7 sub-classes
Other 7th Class locomotives which came onto the SAR roster from the other Colonial railways in the region in 1912, namely the CGR, CSAR, the Natal Government Railways (NGR) and, in 1925, from the New Cape Central Railways (NCCR), were grouped into six different sub-classes by the SAR, becoming SAR Classes 7, 7A to 7C, 7E and 7F.

Modifications
During the 1930s, many of the Class 7 family of locomotives were equipped with superheating and piston valves. On the Class 7B and Class 7C, this conversion was sometimes indicated with an "S" suffix to the class letter on the locomotive number plates, but on the rest of the Class 7 family this distinction was not applied consistently. The superheated versions could be identified by the position of the chimney on the smokebox, the chimney having been displaced forward to provide space behind it in the smokebox for the superheater header.

Service

South Africa
In SAR service, the Class 7 series worked on every system in the country. They remained in branch line service until they were finally withdrawn in 1972.

South West Africa
In 1915, shortly after the outbreak of the First World War, the German South West Africa colony was occupied by the Union Defence Forces. Since a large part of the territory's railway infrastructure and rolling stock was destroyed or damaged by retreating German forces, an urgent need arose for locomotives for use on the Cape gauge lines in that territory. In 1917, numbers 1351 to 1353 were transferred to the Defence Department for service in South West Africa.

These three locomotives remained in South West Africa after the war. The Class 7s proved to be so successful in that territory that more were gradually transferred there in later years. By the time the Class 24 locomotives arrived in SWA in 1949, 53 locomotives of the Class 7 family were still in use there. Most remained there and were only transferred back to South Africa when the Class 32-000 diesel-electric locomotives replaced them in 1961.

Works numbers
Their builders, works numbers and renumbering are listed in the table.

References

Steam locomotives of Rhodesia
1490
1490
4-8-0 locomotives
2D locomotives
Neilson Reid locomotives
Kitson locomotives
NBL locomotives
Cape gauge railway locomotives
Railway locomotives introduced in 1899
1915 in South Africa
Scrapped locomotives